Pater Familias is a 2003 Italian crime-drama film written and directed by Francesco Patierno. It is based on the novel with the same name written by Massimo Cacciapuoti.

It was screened in the Panorama section at the 2003 Berlin Film Festival.

Cast 
Antonella Migliore as Anna
Luigi Jacuzio as Matteo
 Federica Bonavolontà as Rosa
 Francesco Pirozzi as  Michele
 Francesco Di Leva as  Gerardo
 Domenico Balsamo as  Alessandro
Marina Suma as Rosa's mother
 Sergio Solli as Rosa's father
Ernesto Mahieux as  Preside

References

External links

Italian crime drama films
Films based on Italian novels
2003 crime drama films
2003 films
2003 directorial debut films
2000s Italian films